Chylnus is a genus of beetles in the family Carabidae, containing the following species:

 Chylnus ater (Putzeys, 1868)
 Chylnus concolor (Sloane, 1892)
 Chylnus montanum (Casletnau, 1867)
 Chylnus substriatum (Moore, 1960)

References

Nothobroscina
Beetles described in 1920
Carabidae genera